The  is a list of sites, landmarks, machines, and documents that made significant contributions to the development of mechanical engineering in Japan.

Overview 
The Mechanical Engineering Heritage program was inaugurated in June 2007 in connection with the 110th anniversary of the founding of the JSME. The program recognizes machines, related systems, factories, specification documents, textbooks, and other items that had a significant impact on the development of mechanical engineering. When a certified item can no longer be maintained by its current owner, the JSME acts to prevent its loss by arranging a transfer to the National Science Museum of Japan or to a local government institution.

The JSME plans to certify several items of high heritage value over years.

Categories 
Items in the Mechanical Engineering Heritage (Japan) are classified into four categories:

 Sites: Historical sites that contain heritage items.
 Landmarks: Representative buildings, structures, and machinery.
 Collections: Collections of machinery, or individual machines.
 Documents: Machinery-related documents of historical significance.

Each item is assigned a Mechanical Engineering Heritage number.

Items certified in 2007

Sites 
 No. 1: Steam engines and hauling machinery at the Kosuge Ship Repair Dock, (built in 1868). – Nagasaki Prefecture

Landmarks 
 No. 2: Memorial workshop and machine tools at Kumamoto University, (built in 1908). – Kumamoto Prefecture

Collections 
 No. 3: Forged iron treadle lathe (made in 1875 by Kaheiji Ito). – Aichi Prefecture
 No. 4: Industrial steam turbine (Parsons steam turbine), (made in 1908). – Nagasaki Prefecture
 No. 5: 10A rotary engine (made in 1967). – Hiroshima Prefecture
 No. 6: Honda CVCC engine (first engine to meet emission standards of Clean Air Act (1970)). – Tochigi Prefecture
 No. 7: FJR710 jet engine (made in 1971). – Tokyo
 No. 8: Yanmar small horizontal diesel engine, Model HB (made in 1933). – Shiga Prefecture
 No. 9: Prof. Inokuchi's centrifugal pump, (made in 1912). – Aichi Prefecture
 No. 10: High frequency generator (made in 1929 by German AEG). – Aichi Prefecture
 No. 11: 0-Series Tōkaidō Shinkansen electric multiple units (operated 1964–1978). – Osaka Prefecture
 No. 12: Class 230 No.233 2-4-2 steam tank locomotive (made 1902–1909). – Osaka Prefecture
 No. 13: YS11 passenger airplane (flown 1964–2009). – Tokyo
 No. 14: Cub Type F, Honda bicycle engine  (1952). – Tochigi Prefecture
 No. 15: Chain stitch sewing machine for the production of straw hats (made in 1928). – Aichi Prefecture
 No. 16:  Non-stop shuttle change automatic loom, Toyoda Type G (made in 1924). – Aichi Prefecture
 No. 17: Hand operated letterpress printing machine (made in 1885). – Tokyo
 No. 18: Komatsu bulldozer G40 (made in 1943). – Shizuoka Prefecture
 No. 19: Olympus gastrocamera GT-I (made in 1950). – Tokyo
 No. 20: Buckton universal testing machine (installed in 1908). – Hyōgo Prefecture
 No. 21: Mutoh Drafter manual drafting machine, MH-I (made in 1953). – Tokyo
 No. 22: Myriad year clock, (made in 1851). – Tokyo
 No. 23: The Chikugo River Lift Bridge (opened in 1935). – Between Fukuoka and Saga Prefecture

Documents 
 No. 24: JSME publications from the early days of the society, (published in 1897, 1901 and 1934). – Tokyo
 No. 25: "Hydraulics and Hydraulic Machinery", lecture notes by Professors Bunji Mano and Ariya Inokuchi at Imperial University of Tokyo (1905). – Tokyo

Items certified in 2008

Sites 
 No. 26: Sankyozawa hydroelectric power station and related objects, (operating since 1888). – Miyagi Prefecture
 No. 27: Hydraulic lock (made in United Kingdom, operating since 1908) and floating steam crane (operated 1905–2008), Miike Port. – Fukuoka Prefecture

Collections 
 No. 28: “Entaro” bus (Ford TT type), (1923, adapted from chassis imported from United States). – Saitama Prefecture
 No. 29: Mechanical telecommunication devices (made in 1947 by Shinko Seisakusho Co.). – Iwate Prefecture
 No. 30: Mechanical calculator, (Yazu Arithmometer, patented in 1903). – Fukuoka Prefecture
 No. 31: Induction motor and design sheet (made in 1910, in the earliest days of the Japanese electrical machinery industry). – Ibaraki Prefecture

Items certified in 2009

Sites 
 No. 32: Mechanical Device of Sapporo Clock Tower, (clock mechanism imported/installed from E. Howard & Co. in 1881, moved in 1906). – Hokkaidō

Landmarks 
 No. 33: Minegishi Watermill, (installed in 1808, in operation till 1965). – Tokyo

Collections 
 No. 34: The Master Worm Wheel of the Hobbing Machine HRS-500, (machining by Hobbing machine of Rhein-Neckar from Germany in 1943). – Shizuoka Prefecture
 No. 35: Locomobile, The oldest private Steam Automobile in Japan, (one of eight imported from Locomobile Company of America in 1902, failured in 1908, discovered in 1978 then only boiler was replaced and operable in 1980). – Hokkaidō
 No. 36: Arrow-Gou, The oldest Japanese-made Car, (one of Japanese fundamental vehicle technology made in 1916). – Fukuoka Prefecture
 No. 37: British-made 50 ft Turn Table, (imported from Ransomes & Rapier made in 1897, but installed location was unknown before moved in 1941 then further moved to Ōigawa Railway in 1980, in operation. Two others are deemed also imported and still in operation in other locations, these historical details are not known). – Shizuoka Prefecture

Items certified in 2010

Landmarks 

 NO. 38: Carousel El Dorado of Toshimaen, the oldest in Japan and oldest class in worldwide, produced by Hugo Haase (German, 1857–1933) in 1907, travelled in Europe, then moved to Steeplechase Park of Coney Island, New York in 1911, operated till 1964, then purchased, refurbished and operate in Toshimaen since 1971. – Tokyo
 No. 39: Revolving stage and its slewing mechanism of old Konpira Grand Theatre. –  Kagawa Prefecture

Collections 

No. 40: Electric vehicle TAMA (E4S-47 I), produced by Tachikawa Aircraft Company Ltd in 1947, to overcome oil shortage after World War II. The car is with single motor of 36V, 120A, run 65km by single charge, max. speed 35 km/h. The second model in 1949 run 200 km. Used as taxi in Tokyo. Production had stopped due to cost of batteries by the time of the Korean War. – Kanagawa Prefecture
 No. 41: The first made in Japan forklift truck with internal combustion engine,  max. load 6,000 pound, in 1949, learned from Clark Material Handling Company's 4,000 pound type. – Shiga Prefecture
 No. 42: Takasago and Ebara type Centrifugal Refrigerating machine. – Kanagawa Prefecture
 No. 43: Automated Ticket Gate (Turnstile), OMRON and Kintetsu jointly studied from 1964, model PG-D120 operated from 1973 after prototype evaluation from 1967. – Kyoto Prefecture

Items certified in 2011

Landmarks 

 NO. 44: Seikan Train Ferry and Moving Rail Bridge. The ferry service started between Aomori Station of Honshu and Hakodate Station of Hokkaido in 1908, and became train ferry service from 1925 till Seikan Tunnel operated in 1988.

Collections 
 NO. 45: Type ED15 Electric Locomotive. This direct current locomotive is the first Japan-made one in 1924 and operation till 1960. It is functionally equal to imported electric locomotive with specification of maximum speed 65 km/h with 820 KW by four main motors. – Ibaraki Prefecture
Machines are; 2 silk reeling machines out of 300 machines imported by French engineer  for Tomioka silk mill which operated from 1872, Japan made machine based on French and Italian technologies, and some other Japan made improved and innovated machines. – Nagano Prefecture
 NO. 47: Toyoda Power Loom. Looms power by steam engine type and electric motor types invented by Sakichi Toyoda in 1897 and patented next year. Machine's productivity is 20 times high and 1/20 of low in machine cost compared to imported machines, widely used throughout Japan. – Aichi Prefecture
 NO. 48: Hydraulic Excavator UH03 is the first evolved type, made in Japan in 1965, having double hydraulic pumps and double valves with bucket size 0.35 m³ and engine output 58 hp. The excavators made in Japan before UH03 are single hydraulic pump and single valve type under technical tied up with Europe. – Ibaraki Prefecture
 NO. 49: Zipper chain machine (YKK-CM6) is YKK Group first made in Japan machine in 1953, evolved from imported machine from U.S. in 1950. – Toyama Prefecture
 NO. 50: Ticket Vending Machine is the first train ticket vending machine. Developed in 1962, it consists of approximately 250 relays, and can print train tickets for various destinations. It accepts coins, checks them for authenticity, sorts and stores them, and makes change.

Items certified in 2012

Landmarks 
 NO. 51: Tokyu 5200 series made in 1958 is the first railcar applying stainless steel on the exterior aim at no maintenance required of periodical painterwork. Tokyu 7000 series railcar made by Tokyu Car Corporation in 1965 is the first all stainless steel railcar including framing. The framing technologies learned and improved under technical tie-up with Budd Company.- Kanagawa Prefecture
 NO. 52: Yoshino Ropeway opened on March 12, 1929. The oldest surviving aerial lift line in Japan and oldest class in worldwide. – Nara Prefecture

Collections 
 NO. 53: Oldest in Japan England style 9 foot length lathe made by Ikegai Corp., the first machine tool manufacture of Japan, in 1889 for own use. – Tokyo
 NO. 54: Ricoh desktop copier model 101 is the first Japanese blueprint document reproduction machine using the diazo chemical process made in 1955. This copier with the newly innovated photographic paper brings no need to rinse in washing water and no odor operation. – Shizuoka Prefecture
 NO. 55: Washlet G released in 1980 is the first type innovated by Toto. The original model  for therapy of hemorrhoid were imported from American Bidet company in 1964 for Japanese market. Toto opened new market as the electric toilet seats for general use. – Fukuoka Prefecture

Items certified in 2013

Landmarks 
 No. 56:  Mechanical Car Parking System ROTOPARK, made by Bajulaz S.A. company of Switzerland, was imported in 1976 and installed as parking system in underground at south exit of Shinjuku Station. System is controlled by mechanical relay and DC motor. – Tokyo

Collections 
 NO. 57: Dawn of Japanese Home Electric Appliances made by Toshiba. Early years of Shōwa period 1930 to 1931, refrigerator and vacuum cleaner made based on General Electric model, and washing machine produced under technology introduction from Thor washing machine of Chicago-based Hurley Electric Laundry Equipment Company. – Kanagawa Prefecture
 NO. 58: Former Yokosuka Arsenal's steam hammer. Six hammer were imported from Netherlands in 1865 Keiō. After Meiji Restoration, Imperial Japanese Navy, then after World War II, United States Fleet Activities Yokosuka utilized 0.5 ton work load capacity type had been used till 1971 and 3 ton type had been used till 1996. In 2002, hammer were returned to as the property of Japan, and display in Léonce Verny Memorial House. – Kanagawa Prefecture
 NO. 59: Okuma Non-round Plain bearing and GPB Cylindrical Grinder developed by Okuma Corporation in 1954, 700 units produced by 1969, and contributed for Japanese precision mechanical industries. – Aichi Prefecture
 NO. 60: Japan's First 16mm Film Projector. Hand drive projector, study from imported model, made in 1927, and motor drive type developed in 1930 by Elmo company limited. – Aichi Prefecture
 NO. 61: Japanese Automata YUMIHIKI-DOJI, Karakuri ningyō (lit: a boy bending a bow), created by Tanaka Hisashige. – Fukuoka Prefecture

Items certified in 2014

Landmarks 
 No. 62: Soil and Tractor Museum of Hokkaido. Display Tractor and Agricultural machinery innovation in Hokkaido mostly after World War II, and the resultant of artificial soil improvement technologies and agriculture managing philosophy. – Hokkaido
 No. 63: Museum of Agricultural Technology Progress. Imported and Japan made 250 Agricultural machineries powered by human, animal labor then prime mover or engine from late Meiji period to late 1950s to early 1960s. Display includes Japan originated rice transplanter and straw rope producer. – Saitama Prefecture
 No. 64: Telpher of the Port of Shimizu, operating in 1928 to 1971, height 8.4m, total rail length 189.4m, lift up weight 2 to 3 Tonne driven by electric motor, and used to imported wood discharge. – Shizuoka Prefecture

Collections 
 No. 65: Japan-made Snow Vehicles (KD604 & KD605) which reached the South Pole in 1968. Three snow vehicles participated round trip 5200km for 5 months, but one vehicle KD503 was engine troubled and thrown away on outward. The prototype KD501 was not used for the trip, and KD502 is preserved in Showa Station. Trip contributed to find out first meteorite in Antarctic. – KD604 is in Tokyo and KD605 is in Akita Prefecture
 No. 66: Japan-made Wristwatches which Showed Remarkable Technological Innovations. Japan adopted Western style timekeeping system from traditional Japanese time system in 1873. Founder of Seiko, Kintaro Hattori, started in 1982 and produced pocket watch in 1985, first Japanese wrist watch Seiko Laurel in 1913, watch Grand Seiko (グランドセイコー), in 1960, was accurate as Switzerland Chronometer watch then the world's first quartz clock wristwatch Seiko Quartz-Astron 35SQ in 1969. – Tokyo
 No. 67: Double Housing Plaining Machine: Made by Akabane Engineering Works, Ministry of Industry. Double Housing Plaining Machine, 6 foot type machine, with three emblem Chrysanthemum Flower Seal, made by Akabane Engineering Works of Ministry of Industry in 1879. Ministry of Industry produced Japan made various machine tool for industrial innovation aiming to modernization. – Aichi Prefecture
 No. 68: Fuji Automatic Massage Machine, mass production type invented by Fuji (フジ医療器) in 1954. – Osaka Prefecture

Documents 
 No. 69: The Collection of Drawings for Japanese Machines. 288 drawings used, in early Shōwa period first edition in 1932 and revised in 1937, to let engineers learn the ability of Japanese machine the same or not inferior to imported machine. Drawing include 16 industrial field of machines such as measuring devices, steam boiler, steam engine, steam turbine, internal combustion engine, automobile, rolling stock, water wheel, pump, mechanical fan, gas compressor, cryocooler, Machine tool, crane, haulage, spinning and weaving machine. – Tokyo

Items certified in 2015

Landmarks 

 No. 70: Railway bascule bridge "Suehiro Kyoryo". The bridge constructed in December 1931 and still in function as of 2015. The dimension is length 58m, width 4 m, balance scale 24 tons, movement girder length 18 m and weighs 48 tons. – Mie Prefecture

Collection 
 No. 71: Automatic Encrusting Machine Model 105. High viscosity material such as dough, for Manjū and  wagashi of Japan and bread worldwide, is traditionally encrusting by human hand. The automatic encrusting machine is invented as model 101 in 1963, and improved model 105 in 1966, then it had been sold 1838 set in 8 years and contributing world food cultures in effective making. – Tochigi Prefecture
 No. 72: Automatic Transmission of "MIKASA". The first Japanese Automatic transmission with torque converter developed in 1951 and  front-wheel drive car MIKASA produced over 500 cars in 1957 to 1960. – Tokyo
 No. 73: Japan Made First Coin counter. The coin counter asked by mint and produced in 1949 and delivered in February 1950. Imported large size of coin counter was used before this improved type with small size, simple structure and more accurate counting. Commercial type put in market in 1953. Selectable various coin size and counting ability contributed to lessen banking job for coin counting and Japan made full-line vending machines. – Hyogo Prefecture
 No. 74: KOBAS Stationary Suction Gas Engine and Charcoal Gas Producer Unit. Wood gas engine with magneto ignition system had been started to develop in 1928 and produced in 1936. Less resource of petroleum during and after World War II in Japan, wood gas engine had been widely used by about 1955. – Hiroshima Prefecture
 No. 75: Small Once-through Steam Boiler Type ZP. This once-through Steam drum type boiler less than 10 Atmospheric pressure and 10 m2 had been usable without license by change of law Industrial Safety and Health Act in 1959 then 70% shared in small boiler market. – Ehime Prefecture
 No. 76: All Electric Industrial Robot "MOTOMAN-L10". MOTOMAN-L10 is first all electric drive industrial robot developed in 1977. Before this, Hydraulic drive system robot used  with less accurate positioning, moving range and speed. – Fukuoka Prefecture

Items certified in 2016

Landmarks 
 No. 77: Matsukawa Geothermal Power Plant. Operated in 1966, the first commercial power plant in Japan. To avoid erosion and corrosion of steam turbine blade from sulfur, turbine is made of chromium, molybdenum and vanadium steel without nickel. Initial power was 9,500ｋW, then improved to 23,500ｋW in 1993. – Iwate Prefecture

Collection 
 No. 78: SUBARU 360-K111. Japanese government proposed "national car" concept in 1955, then produced in 1958. Nicknamed tentoumushi means coccinellidae comparable to Volkswagen Beetle. – Gunma Prefecture
 No. 79: Double Expansion Marine Steam Engine. Main engine, 97 horsepower, of small wooden guard ship  Tachibana maru  (Kanji: たちばな丸) in port of Kobe since 1911. Ship used as training ship by Kobe University (former Kobe University of Mercantile Marine) till 1964. – Saitama prefecture
 No. 80: Simple Cash register Zeni-ai-ki. Produced in 1916 in lieu of imported expensive cash register. Attractive naming Zeni-ai-ki, literal meaning is money-matching-machine instead of traditional calculation by soroban, sold more than 10,000 units by 1927, well sold and widely used till further innovated type appeared after war over in 1945. – Tokyo
 No. 81: Tatsuno's Patent Gasoline Measuring Equipment Type No.25. First Japan made fuel dispenser in 1919. Implemented safety patented mechanism well worked and no fire in time of 1923 Great Kantō earthquake. – Kanagawa Prefecture
 No. 82: Gate-type Car Wash Machine. Gate shaped Japanese first car wash machine with horizontal and two side vertical rotating brush type and wash up a car in three minutes developed in 1962. Before this, car wash is manual brushing with waterjet in 1950s. – Aichi Prefecture
 No. 83: Optical Instruments of the Kashinozaki Lighthouse. Japan first one of eight Western style rotating flashing light lighthouse technically advised by Richard Henry Brunton operate in 1870. This is the first stone building out of 26 lighthouse advised and guided by him.  – Wakayama Prefecture

Items certified in 2017

Site 

 No. 84: Mechanical equipment full set in the bascule bridge at Kachidoki bridge. Kachidoki Bridge (勝鬨橋), bascule type bridge, the pivot axis to river other side pivot axis over Sumida River, is 51.6 m the longest length in Japan, and total length of the bridge is 246.0 m, constructed in 1940, movable operation ended in 1970, and classified Important Cultural Property in 2007. The one side of movable bridge part weight is 1,000 tonne with counterweight of 1,000 tonne, both river side total  movable bridge part weighs 4,000 tonne in symmetry. The open or close speed is controlled by Ward Leonard control with combination of AC motor and DC motor. – Tokyo
 No. 85: The longitudinal flow ventilation system by jet fan (booster fan) of Okuda Tunnel. The first eight units with jet fans having an inner diameter 630mm and length 4.7m were imported from German Voith  and well tested, data evaluated, then applied in Okuda Tunnel (奥田トンネル) of Kitakyusyu Expressway in 1966, and used until tunnel width widen and changed to one-way traffic in 1975. This jet fan air ventilating direction is along length of tunnel and ventilating technology founded this application contributed more than eighty percent of tunnels of mountains in Japan. Two units is preserved. – Osaka Prefecture.

Collection 
 No. 86: Electric car of Japan's first subway. Tokyo Metro Ginza Line, Ueno to Asakusa opened in 1927. The electric car, length 16m × width 2.6m × height 3.5m and weight 35.5 tonne, constructed with imported basic major parts and applied mechanical systems of ATS used in overseas. – Tokyo
 No. 87: Deep Submergence Research Vehicle SHINKAI 2000. Shinkai 2000 is the succession manned machine after Japanese first manned SHINKAI (1970–1976). – Kanagawa Prefecture
 No. 88: Green Sand Molding Machine Type C-11. The first Japanese sand casting molding machine capable to make 450mm×300mm×height 200mm mold, instead of traditional handmade mold. This machine was own developed in 1927, by refer to imported machine from United States. – Aichi Prefecture
 No. 89: Multihead Weigher ACW-M-1. Japanese first patented weighting machine, for various weight of number of bell pepper sorted and grouped by CPU to thirty single selling volume of 150±2g in a minute without damage bell pepper, invented in 1973. Innovated Multihead Weigher series machine sold more than 30,000 units, and widely used for packing of snack, agricultural products, sausage, frozen food, pharmaceutical drug, machine component and others with major market share. –  Shiga Prefecture
 No. 90: Full Automatic Glove Knitting Machine (Square Fingertip Type). Knitting glove for field army, Japanese term Gun-te (軍手 literally: army-hand) used to protect hand since Meiji period produced by hand knitting or semi-automatic. Full automated machine with sinker knitting method invented in 1964, producing single piece, or half of pair, of glove in 2 minutes and 15 seconds, and single worker monitors and controls 30 machines. – Wakayama Prefecture

Items certified in 2018

Collection 
 No. 91: Historical Machine Tools collected by Nippon Institute of Technology. 232 units of machine tools are displayed in the museum. These units indicate historical transition of machine tools in Japan, from import, make with replica, then by technical license agreement, in period of mid Meiji to Shōwa 50s (1975–1984). – Saitama Prefecture
 No. 92: Airless Spray Painting Equipment. Under United States patent license, first made in Japan equipment with some improvements put on market in 1959. – Aichi Prefecture
 No. 93: CRT Funnel Pressing Machine. Cathode ray tube of television production in Japan started under technical license from United States. The front face part and centrifugal cast rear funnel part produced separately, and weld combined in early stage, after the funnel press machine appeared as new methodology, its production time, welding accuracy, quality and productivity was improved. The market share of Japan made cathode ray tube of 24 inch size and over was almost 100 percent at the end of 1980s. – Siga Prefecture
 No. 94: Type Casting Machine of Newspaper Museum. Museum of Kumamoto Daily News displays various newspaper publishing machines, and one of them is Japan made first Man-nen jidou katsuji cyuzoki (万年自働活字鋳造機 (lit.:Ten thousand years life automatic type casting machine)) reflecting number of patents put in market in 1934 capable to cast 10.5 point with speed of 90 Japanese letter types in minute, used till 1982. – Kumamoto Prefecture

Items certified in 2019

Landmarks  
No. 95: Conduit Gate of Tase Dam. Japan communicated frequently in detail and learned from U.S. and adding own Japanese technology to improve U.S. made four high-pressure slide gates (conduit gates), then installed in the world record deepest near the bottom of the lake of dam completed in 1945. The water discharge system (the discharge volume per gate is 120 m3/s) from the lake, it became foundation of technologies to apply other dams thereafter. – Iwate Prefecture

No. 96: Oil Mining and Refine System at Kanazu Oilfield. Crude oil drilling and mining attempted before Meiji era, however not commercialization due to collapsible stratum. Kanichi Nakano (中野貫一) succeeded in manual drilling, mining and refining and production volume 150,000 kiloliters/year in 1916 and he was called oil king of Japan. Further mechanical method deployed, however it closed in 1998 and the museum opened to display facilitated machines and materials in 2008. – Niigata Prefecture

No. 97: Steam Locomotives Preserved at Kyoto Railway Museum and Related Objects. 23 steam locomotives used until 1984, its maintenance facility and records are preserved. 8 locomotives out of 23, railway roundhouse and railway turntable are still operational. – Kyoto Prefecture

Collection 
No. 98: Dawn of Japanese Passenger Elevator. The elevator imported from U.S. with basic elements, cage, guide rail and  emergency stop system, were further studied then full push button automatic type elevator developed in 1915, and deployed in Japan. Displaying an elevator and related Japanese own process history of technological studies and improvements. – Fukui Prefecture

No. 99: Monorail for Steep Slope MONORACK M-1. The simple cable transport system, on steep slope hills and mountains of cultivating mikan orchard in area of Seto Inland Sea, was widely used. In 1966 the newly developed monorail system capable of transporting crops in slope angle up to 40 degree and to curve left and right directions flexibly. This monorail is effectiveness in more free design for installation and laborsaving. – Okayama Prefecture

Items certified in 2020

Collection & Documents 
No. 100: Educational Equipment for Mechanical Engineering of Imperial College of Engineering/Related Documents of C.D. West. The dawn of modern engineering in Japan is coincidently the same period of textbooks published in Western Europe.  in Tokyo is believed the first university worldwide bearing the name engineering and succeeded by Tokyo Imperial University (東京帝國大學, Tōkyō teikoku daigaku). A Number of Technical drawing, tool, Mechanism, model, lecture note and educational material used by Charles Dickinson West, Henry Dyer and others are preserved and displayed. - Tokyo

Collection 
No. 101: ASAHIFLEX I・IIB, MIRANDA T, ZUNOW, NIKON F Single-lens reflex (SLR) cameras, which advanced Japanese cameras to the world standard. The five Japanese Single-lens reflex camera models, with more convenience and robustness, in 1950s, Asahi Flex I, IIB, Miranda T, Zunow and Nikon F, revolutionary opening new era of reputation and wording from Camera is German made to Camera is Japan made. - Tokyo

No. 102: NARA Jiyu Mill (High-speed Impact Mill, First Milling Machine Manufactured in Japan). Laboratory of Furukawa Group asked  to make improved pulverizer for casein with physical property of elasticity and thermostability, he referenced German made pulverizer and the first commercialized NARA Jiyu Milling machine with utility model in 1928. By strong impact and shearing force without generate heat, the pulverizer utilize to produce granular material of mineral, medicinal plants, food, dye, fodder, medicines and more. – Tokyo

No. 103: Electric Arc Spray Gun in the early era of thermal spraying. M.U.Schoop of University of Zurich get patent for metal thermal spraying in 1909. However Jewellery shop  TENSHODO in Ginza obtained exclusive right to use this patented technology in 1919 aiming at gas thermal spraying apply to jewellery was not succeeded, Japanese patent invented electric melting to spray electroplating in 1921. Since 1935 industrial use deployed, and further improvement in 1955 and 1963, and beginning to start surface finishing to prevent rust on railroad, water container and others and further applied wide industrial use thermostability, abrasion resistance and chemical resistance. – Siga Prefecture

No. 104:Continuously Variable Transmission/Ring-Cone Type. Power transmission take place through oil fluid without solid parts contact of power input cone to output cone, so that no wear of each cone. CVT is widely used on conveyor belt, machine tool and other area due to simple structure and low cost. It functions no slip and 2 to 3% or less rotation rate fluctuation by automatic each cone contact pressure-regulating mechanism. – Kyoto

Items certified in 2021

Collection 
No. 105: Existing Japan's first Electric milking machine DK-5 II. The machine is less price but better specifications and the relief of dairy farming hand milking hard physical labor, also health enhancement for Japanese people. The basic structure or mechanism of the machine is still applied since then. - Nagano Prefecture

No. 106: Spur Gear Grinding Machine Type ASG-2. Gear is the one of essential Machine element. When gear implemented into the machine, machine should operate with less noise and vibration, so that these gear is required to be made by process of grinding machine. Even entered into Showa era, there were several number of such process machines in the world, made by Switzerland company MAAG or others, but not in Japan. One machine is preserved at museum of Nippon Institute of Technology. Unique feature of this grinding machine is by changing the consisting gear, it is able to produce variety of gears with different size and number of tooth. – Saitama prefecture

No. 107: Sushi Machine. Automated grasp then make molding sushi rice (Nigirizushi) machine is developed by  under deep study of sushi artisan’s technique in 1981. Suzumo Machinery aimed in order to recover and increase total Japan rice consumption volume under the fact that the amount of rice consumption decreasing along with adjusting rice production under Japan set-aside policy, let people eat sushi more with less price in sushi shop is one of solution as consumer behavior. The machine produced 1,200 unit of sushi molding per hour, and opening conveyor belt sushi system. – Saitama Prefecture

No. 108: Rolling stock Test Stand for Shinkansen. Feasibility study for Shinkansen rolling stock targeting maximum speed 250 km/h and 350 km/h of bogie is unfeasible in real environment, so that the stationary simulation test device created by Hitachi and installed by JNR in 1959. Test carry out for various simulate locomotive conditions from the control and monitor room. After the test stand completed, prototype Tokaido Shinkansen bogie test started in 1960, and contributed to determine feasible railed vehicle specification. New test stand developed for maximum speed 500 km/h in 1990, but still this test stand operate and in use. – Tokyo

No. 109: Japanese oldest pitching machines Catapult type：KS-P/AR. Type KS-P is produced in 1958 and preserved in The Baseball Hall of Fame and Museum of Japan in Tokyo Dome and type AR is produced in the same time and preserved in Chunichi batting center. The mechanism is to pitch 12 throwing in a minute, fastball and breaking ball with rotation by means of hook, by reaction of compressed spring, and it is equivalent to 15 pitchers and well worked in lieu of batting practice pitcher. Arm-type and wheel type pitching machine are produced as follower machines, and batting center became popular amusement place. - Tokyo (KS-P) and Gifu prefecture (AR)

No. 110: Electric Hand Planer Model 1000. Makita produced electric hand planer as the first consumer use product, by referring to United States made electric hand planer, suitable in terms of light weight, Japanese building material processing size, and easy handling by carpenter in 1958. Until then, plane job is physically heavy work, and required expertise. Electric planer Model 1000 opened other type of carpenter’s various electric power tool consequently. This model consists of two blades of 120 mm width rotates 13,000 per minute, 26,000 cut, in a minute on 100 volt home mains electricity, realized easy process for hardwood and softwood, even against wood grain. – Aichi Prefecture

No. 111: The Coining Presses during the Founding Period of the Japan Mint; Uhlhorn Münzprägemaschine and Presse Montaire de Thonnelier. In 1871, start-up Japan Mint was largest metal processing factory, melting bullion, casting, rolling, and die stamping making coin by the power of steam engine. The final stamping machine is invented by Diedrich Uhlhorn in 1817, and imported 10 units in 1871 to 1873, which produced 40 coins per minute. Other 8 units of French machine developed by Nicolas Thonnelier, made in 1857, were purchased from closed Hong Kong  mint was capable to produce 50 coins per minute, and one out of 8 is preserved. Both of these preserved machine are historical value of Japanese coin processing and only several number of machines are preserved worldwide. - Osaka Prefecture

No. 112: Conveyor belt sushi machine, Origin of the new food culture. Number of small dish-sized plates with shape like scale or crescent concatenated to form swivel or circle conveyor. Conveyor belt sushi mechanism,  inspired it come up with brewery bottling line system in 1948, and opened first sushi shop in Higashi Osaka in 1958. The machine certified here in is made in 1985 and still operating. - Osaka Prefecture

No. 113: Hydraulic Pile press-in and extraction Machinery Silent Piler KGK-100A. As initial step, provided that two or three deep foundation piles already be pressed-in in advance by means of, other than ordinary usage, put heavy load and keep SILENT PILER down on the ground and press-in, then as the ordinary usage step this piling machine ride on and underneath handle grips these plies. Hydraulic static load to press-in consecutive next pile of opposite drag reaction force is smaller than pull-out drag reaction force of gripped  two or three plies, so that this piling machine steadily stand and work to press-in plies one after another by move, ride on and grip newly pressed-in next pile. Heavy equipment applied hydraulic pressure is 14 to 17 MPa, but in order press-in or pull-out a plie required new developing design of the hydraulic device with 70 MPa for 100 Ton of drive force to a plie. The sound noise pollution of hammer hitting pile driver type is approximately 100  dB, and this Silent Piler is only 55 dB. - Kochi Prefecture

Items certified in 2022

Collection 
No. 114: Surface Grinding Machine PSG-6B. Surface grinding machine is used for final surface finishing for machine element. This machine implements horizontal moving rectangle table with grinding unit which move up and down precisely.  applied self-developed hydraulic pump and hydraulic cylinder to drive the rectangle table and four precision ball bearings on the grinding unit, then possible to move producing machine element by 0.001 mm steps, and it was the first machine realized 1/1,000 mm of precision surface finishing in 1953. -  Gunma Prefecture

No. 115: Timber pre-cut system MPS-1. 57 percent of Japanese houses are constructed with timber, and 43 percent, out of 57 percent, is by wooden column and beam construction method structure in tradition by skilled carpenter.  Carpenter designs each house and woodworking timber on the construction site. , manufacturer of timber processing machine, planned to improve with developed machine by pre-cut or previously cut to column and beam from timber at factory, instead of process timber on site, however, carpenter have not accepted improved system until trend changed housing market and labor shortage in 1978. CAD and CAM is further added to total system in 1985, then this Timber pre-cut system MPS-1 had changed construction with  pre-cut method expanded to 93 percent today. – Aichi Prefecture

No. 116: Hand-cranked Garabo Spinning Machine. Meiji government aimed to more productivity of cotton yarn production with imported cotton-spinning machinery, but machines were so expensive.  invented simple hand rotating low cost Gaun-method cotton-spinning machine or Gara bo, then exhibit next year at first National Industrial Exhibition in 1877. The machine was well evaluated at exhibition, and applied for larger diameter or thicker cotton thread producing, actually machine drive by water wheel, in Mikawa Province where such industry had been leading and became top level of producing area, then machine deployed widely in country. After World War II, lifestyle changed and Western machines again used, because of Gara bo specialized for larger diameter or thicker thread, not for small diameter or thin thread, so that the peak number of machine working was in 1960, several number of machine still working today. Gara bo machine contributed thread spinning industry, yarn export from Japan, and acquisition of foreign currency to Japan. Precise replica is demonstrating at Toyota Commemorative Museum of Industry and Technology in Nagoya. - Osaka Prefecture

See also
 List of historic mechanical engineering landmarks
 List of historic civil engineering landmarks

References

External links 
 The Japan Society of Mechanical Engineers, JSME
 The Mechanical Engineering Heritage

2007 establishments in Japan
Archives in Japan
History of science and technology in Japan
Cultural history of Japan
Science and technology in Japan
History of mechanical engineering
Japan history-related lists